Sykidion is a genus of green algae. Pseudoneochloris is a synonym of this genus. , Sykidion was the only genus in the family Sykidiacaeae, which was the only family in the order Sykidiales.

Species
, AlgaeBase accepted the following species:
Sykidion droebakense Wille
Sykidion dyeri E.P.Wright
Sykidion gomphonematis K.I.Meyer
Sykidion marinum (Shin Watanabe & al.) Darienko & al., syn. Pseudoneochloris marina
Sykidion praecipitans (Tschermak-Woess) Komárek

References

Sphaeropleales genera
Sphaeropleales